Seffner Christian Academy is a private Christian school located in Seffner, Florida, United States. It was established in 1983. Seffner Christian enrolls over 600 students. In 2013, the Tampa Bay Business Journal listed SCA as Tampa's 21st most expensive private school, out of 23 rated.

Arts 

Fine arts programs include Band, Choir, and Drama.

Athletics 

The school's athletic teams are referred to as the Crusaders.

Seffner Christian Academy has participated in the FHSAA since 2005 and has appeared in 32 district finals and six regional finals as of 2012. Football was introduced to SCA in 2010, and in 2012 an SCA student was awarded the first football scholarship ever awarded by Olivet Nazarene University. For many years, the school has hosted the Jan Bennett basketball tournament, which raises funds to pay for Hillsborough County basketball all-star recognition and events.

The school fields teams in the following sports:

 Basketball
 Football
 Soccer
 Volleyball
 Baseball
 Softball
 Cheerleading
 Cross country
 Tennis
 Track & field
 Beach Volleyball

Demographics 

The student body is evenly divided between male and female students. Approximately 55% are white, 22% Hispanic, 19% black and 4% Asian.

The school has special programs to help working mothers.

Notes

External links 

 Seffner Christian Academy website
 Seffner Christian Academy Athletics website

Christian schools in Florida
Educational institutions established in 1983
High schools in Hillsborough County, Florida
Private high schools in Florida
Private middle schools in Florida
1983 establishments in Florida